Genoplesium ostrinum, commonly known as the purple midge orchid, is a species of small terrestrial orchid that is endemic to New South Wales. It has a single thin leaf and up to ten dark purple flowers with darker stripes and a hairy labellum which vibrates in the slightest breeze.

Description
The labellum quivers in the slightest breeze. Flowering occurs between February and April.

Taxonomy and naming
Genoplesium ostrinum was first formally described in 2001 by David Jones and the description was published in The Orchadian. In 2002, Jones and Mark Clements changed the name to Corunastylis ostrina but the change is not accepted by the Australian Plant Census. The specific epithet (ostrinum) is a Latin word meaning "purple".

Distribution and habitat
The purple midge orchid grows with shrubs or grasses in woodland between Tallong and Braidwood.

References

ostrinum
Endemic orchids of Australia
Orchids of New South Wales
Plants described in 2001